Duke of Liría and Jérica is a title of Spanish nobility, accompanied by the dignity of Grandee of Spain, created the 13 of December of 1707 by King Philip V of Spain for James FitzJames, the illegitimate son of King James II and Arabella Churchill.

Its name refers to the towns of Liria, located in the Province of Valencia, and Jérica, located in the Province of Castellón.

Its original denomination, at the time of its concession was "Duke of Liria and Xérica".

Dukes of Liria and Jérica (1707–present)
James FitzJames, 1st Duke of Liria and Xérica
James Fitz-James Stuart, 2nd Duke of Liria and Xérica
Jacobo Fitz-James Stuart, 3rd Duke of Liria and Xérica
Carlos Fitz-James Stuart, 4th Duke of Liria and Jérica
Jacobo Fitz-James Stuart, 5th Duke of Liria and Jérica
Jacobo Fitz-James Stuart, 6th Duke of Liria and Jérica
Carlos Miguel Fitz-James Stuart, 7th Duke of Liria and Jérica
Jacobo Fitz-James Stuart, 8th Duke of Liria and Jérica
Carlos María Fitz-James Stuart, 9th Duke of Liria and Jérica
Jacobo Fitz-James Stuart, 10th Duke of Liria and Jérica
Cayetana Fitz-James Stuart, 11th Duchess of Liria and Jérica
Carlos Fitz-James Stuart, 12th Duke of Liria and Jérica

See also
List of dukes in the peerage of Spain
List of current Grandees of Spain

Dukedoms of Spain
Grandees of Spain
Lists of dukes
Lists of Spanish nobility
Noble titles created in 1707